Bhabanipur is a union parishad of Baruda upazila in Comilla district of Bangladesh.

Population 
Almost 21,550.

History 
Bhabanipur Union was formerly known as Bhabanipur South Union.

Location and boundaries 
Bhabanipur Union is located in the northeastern part of Baruda upazila. It is bounded on the south by Shilmuri North Union, on the west by Baruda Municipality, on the north by Aganagar Union and Kalirbazar Union of Comilla Adarsh Sadar Upazila and on the east by Comilla Sadar Dakshin Upazila Bijoypur Union.

Administrative structure 
Bhabanipur Union is under Barura Upazila. Administrative activities of this union are under Baruda police station. It is part of the Comilla-6 constituency of the Jatiya Sangsad.

Education 
Secondary Schools:

 Bataichhari High School

Madrasas:

 Bataichhari Dakhil Madrasa

Primary schools:

 Jalgaon Government Primary School
 Lakshmipur Primary School
 Bhabanipur Primary School

Local markets 

 Bataichari New Market (Sujatnagar) 
 Bataichhari Old Market 
 Jalgaon Fakir Market 
 Bhabanipur Super Market

See also 
 Barura Upazila
 Comilla District

References

External links 

Coordinates not on Wikidata
Cumilla District
Unions of Barura Upazila